Turned A (capital: Ɐ, lowercase: ɐ, math symbol ∀) is a letter and symbol based upon the letter A.

Modern usage 

 Lowercase ɐ (in Roman or two story form) is used in the International Phonetic Alphabet to identify the near-open central vowel. This is not to be confused with the turned alpha or turned script a, ɒ, which is used in the IPA for the open back rounded vowel.
 The logical symbol ∀, has the same shape as a sans-serif capital turned A. It is used to represent universal quantification in predicate logic, where it is typically read as "for all". It was first used in this way by Gerhard Gentzen in 1935, by analogy with Giuseppe Peano's turned E notation for existential quantification and the later use of Peano's notation by Bertrand Russell. 
 In traffic engineering it is used to represent flow, the number of units (vehicles) passing a point in a unit of time. 
 It may also be used in unit rates.

Historical usage 

It was used in the 18th century by Edward Lhuyd and William Pryce as a phonetic character for the Cornish language. In their books, both Ɐ and ɐ have been used. It was used in the 19th century by Charles Sanders Peirce as a logical symbol for 'un-American' ("unamerican").

According to the principle of acrophony, the letter A originated from the Proto-Sinatic alphabet as a symbol representing the head of an ox or cow (aleph), its orientation and original meaning having been lost over time. The turned A symbol restores the letter to a more easily recognizable logographic representation of an ox's head.

 is used in the Uralic Phonetic Alphabet.

Encodings

See also
List of logic symbols
List of mathematical symbols
Transformation of text
Rotated letter

References

Logic symbols
A
Phonetic transcription symbols